Bishopdale College is a theological college in Nelson, New Zealand. Its former dean is the now Assistant Bishop of Adelaide, Tim Harris. It opened in 1868.

Eminent alumni include
 John Pratt Kempthorne
George William York

Notes

Educational institutions established in 1868
Anglican seminaries and theological colleges
Seminaries and theological colleges in New Zealand
Education in the Nelson Region
1868 establishments in New Zealand